Alceste Madeira Almeida do Nascimento (22 March 1944 – 15 December 2021) was a Brazilian politician. A member of the Republicans, he served in the Chamber of Deputies from 1990 to 2006.

References

1944 births
2021 deaths
People from Manaus
Brazilian politicians
Republicans (Brazil) politicians
Members of the Chamber of Deputies (Brazil) from Amazonas